Arthrobacter flavus is a species of psychrophilic bacteria. It is aerobic, gram-positive, non-spore-forming, non-motile, exhibits a rod-coccus growth cycle and produces a yellow pigment.

References

Further reading
Whitman, William B., et al., eds. Bergey's manual® of systematic bacteriology. Vol. 5. Springer, 2012.

External links

LPSN
Type strain of Arthrobacter flavus at BacDive -  the Bacterial Diversity Metadatabase

Micrococcaceae
Psychrophiles
Bacteria described in 2000